Champions Challenge might refer to two different field hockey tournaments organized by the International Hockey Federation (FIH):

Hockey Champions Challenge I: introduced in 2001 as Hockey Champions Challenge, its name changed in 2009 to the current one.
Hockey Champions Challenge II: introduced in 2009.